Dave Chavarri is a Peruvian American musician, and is the founder, producer, manager, and drummer for the band Ill Niño, and Terror Universal. He is also the former drummer for bands Soulfly, Pro-Pain, M.O.D., Merauder and Lȧȧz Rockit, and Gothic Slam. Chavarri is also the owner of entertainment company C.I.A Management, whose roster includes Ill Niño, Terror Universal, and others.

Biography
Chavarri was born in Lima, Peru, and moved to New Jersey at age 10.
 
Since 2000, Dave has produced many bands including Ill Niño, Terror Universal, Exilia, Broom Hellda, May The Silence Fail, Violent Delight.  Chavarri has worked with producers such as Jay Baumgardner, Ron Saint Germain and Bob Marlette.

Ill Niño's debut album Revolution Revolución was released on September 18, 2001, and was produced and engineered by Chavarri. Chavarri has performed globally with such acts as Ozzy Osbourne,  Disturbed, Godsmack, System of a Down, Sevendust, P.O.D. and Slayer.

In 2015, Chavarri formed heavy metal band Terror Universal.

Discography 
Nothing'$ $acred with Lȧȧz Rockit (1991, Roadrunner Records)
Devolution with M.O.D. (1994, Music for Nations/Blackout)
Pro-Pain with Pro-Pain (1998)
Revolution Revolución with Ill Niño (2001, Roadrunner/Universal)
Confession with Ill Niño (2003, Roadrunner/Universal)
One Nation Underground with Ill Niño (2005, Roadrunner/Universal)
Enigma with Ill Niño (2008, Cement Shoes)
Dead New World with Ill Niño (2010, Victory)
Epidemia with Ill Niño (2012, Victory)
Till Death, La Familia with Ill Niño (2014, Victory)
Make Them Bleed with Terror Universal (2018)

References

External links

1967 births
American people of Peruvian descent
Ill Niño members
American heavy metal drummers
People from Union City, New Jersey
Peruvian drummers
Peruvian emigrants to the United States
Living people
M.O.D. members